Tiruchenkattankudi Uthirapasupatheeswarar Temple
( ) is a Hindu temple located at Tiruchengattankudi  in Tiruvarur district, Tamil Nadu, India. The historical name of the place is Ganapatheesaram.The temple is dedicated to Shiva, as the moolavar presiding deity, in his manifestation as Uthirapasupatheeswarar. His consort, Parvati, is known as Vaaitha Tirukuzhal Umai Nayaki.

Significance 
It is one of the shrines of the 275 Paadal Petra Sthalams - Shiva Sthalams glorified in the early medieval Tevaram poems by Tamil Saivite Nayanars Tirugnanasambandar and Tirunavukkarasar.

Literary mention 
Tirunavukkarasar describes the feature of the deity as:

References

External links

Gallery

Shiva temples in Tiruvarur district
Padal Petra Stalam